Each  Copa América since 1987 has its own mascot. Gardelito, the mascot for the 1987 competition, was the first Copa América mascot. The mascot designs show some representing a characteristic feature (costume, flora, fauna, etc.) of the host country.

The Copa América mascot is frequently one or more anthropomorphic characters targeted at children with cartoon shows and other merchandise released to coincide with the competition.

List of mascots

See also
 List of FIFA World Cup official mascots
 List of FIFA Women's World Cup official mascots
 List of UEFA European Championship official mascots
 List of Africa Cup of Nations official mascots
 List of AFC Asian Cup official mascots

References

 
Association football mascots
Lists of mascots